The 1981–82 Coppa Italia, the 35th Coppa Italia was an Italian Football Federation domestic cup competition won by Internazionale.

Group stage

Group 1

Group 2

Group 3

Group 4

Group 5

Group 6

Group 7

Quarter-finals 
Join the defending champion: Roma.

p=after penalty shoot-out

Semi-finals

Final

First leg

Second leg

Inter won 2–1 on aggregate.

Top goalscorers

References 
 rsssf.com
 Official site
 Bracket

Coppa Italia seasons
Coppa Italia
Coppa Italia